Dowkushkan-e Reza Khani (also Romanized as Dowkūshkān-e Reẕā Khānī; also known as Dokūshkān-e Reẕā Khānī) is a village in Mahidasht Rural District, Mahidasht District, Kermanshah County, Kermanshah Province, Iran. At the 2006 census, its population was 31, in 9 families.

References 

Populated places in Kermanshah County